Sourp Stepanos Church (Saint Stephen) is the Armenian Apostolic church in Larnaca, Cyprus.

The church is located in the town centre of Larnaca and was originally built in 1909 as a small chapel in memory of Adana's patron saint, Sourp Stepanos (Saint Stephen), by Armenian refugees who fled the Adana massacre. Following a fund-raising in 1912 and 1913, the church was completed on 1 April 1913. The first official liturgy took place in May 1914 and the consecration took place in 1918 by Archbishop Taniel Hagopian. According to the commemorative inscription in front of the entrance it was built "in memory of the martyrs of Cilicia, 1 April 1909". It is considered to be the first monument in the world for the Armenian massacres, even before the Armenian genocide.

The Sourp Stepanos church is decorated with beautiful icons and its altar is made of wood (1909). The central icon was painted in 1913. It was renovated in 1956-1957 and again in 1998. It is located in the same grounds with the Larnaca Nareg school, which used to be adjacent to the church before it was re-built in 1995-1996. Liturgies are held there every other Sunday.

The current pastor of the Sourp Stepanos church is Der Mashdots Ashkarian.

References 

 

Armenian diaspora in Cyprus
Churches completed in 1909
Armenian churches in Cyprus